Yabeinosaurus is an extinct genus of lizard from the Early Cretaceous Jehol Group of northeastern China. The type species Yabeinosaurus tenuis is known from many well-preserved skeletons belonging to both juvenile and adult individuals. For about 60 years Yabeinosaurus was known only from juvenile specimens, leading scientists to believe that it was a small lizard with weakly developed bones. Because of this, it was thought to be closely related to geckos. Larger specimens up to  snout‐vent length.

long were first described in 2005, showing that Yabeinosaurus was a relatively large lizard when fully grown. Recent phylogenetic analyses indicate that Yabeinosaurus is not closely related to geckos but rather a very basal ("primitive") lizard close to the split between Iguania and Scleroglossa, one of the earliest divergences in the evolutionary history of lizards. Whether or not it lies outside this split or within Scleroglossa is uncertain. In 2011 a fossil of Yabeinosaurus was discovered with 15 well-developed embryos inside it, making it the oldest fossil of a pregnant, viviparous (live-bearing) lizard yet discovered.

References

Cretaceous lizards
Early Cretaceous reptiles of Asia
Fossil taxa described in 1942